Chris Finn is a Canadian stand-up comedian and comedy writer.

Finn was raised in Ottawa, Ontario. He has written for several television shows, including MAD TVThis Hour Has 22 Minutes, Talking to Americans, The Rick Mercer Report and Corner Gas.  He has won five Gemini Awards and a 2001 Canadian Comedy Award as a writer for This Hour Has 22 Minutes.

References

Canadian stand-up comedians
Canadian television writers
Living people
Comedians from Ontario
Canadian people of Irish descent
Canadian Screen Award winners
Year of birth missing (living people)